Sunshine Radio is a local radio station, based in Ludlow, Shropshire. The station currently serves south Shropshire, north Herefordshire and north Worcestershire.

History
Sunshine Radio in Ludlow dates back to the late-1970s. In the summer of 1986 a special event radio station for the Stoke-on-Trent national garden festival occupied the 1017 kHz frequency. It was to be 12 months before Sunshine was heard again The Government once again announced plans for community radio licences in 1988. In 1990 the Sunshine management formed a new company, South Shropshire Communications Ltd. They were granted a test and development licence. In 1992, the Radio Authority advertised a licence for Ludlow and South Shropshire. South Shropshire Communications Ltd applied and won the licence finally taking to the air on 18 October 1992 as Sunshine 855. The new transmitters were still at Villa Farm with studios in a converted house in Ludlow. In 2013 Sunshine Radio won a broadcasting licence to take the Ludlow version of the station onto the FM band.

Present day
The Breakfast show continues to be presented live from Sunshine Radio's studios on the Burway Trading Estate in Ludlow. The rest of programming comes from Sunshine Radio's network studio in Hereford.

The Ludlow studio is located on the Burway Trading Estate, just off Bromfield Road in the north of Ludlow.

Transmitting stations
855 kHz AM – Villa Farm, between Ludlow and Tenbury Wells
105.9 FM – Woofferton transmitting station, south of Ludlow
107.8 FM - Clee Hill

See also
Sunshine Radio (FM)
Sunshine 1530
South Shropshire Communications Ltd Companies House entry

External links
 Change of control review – Ofcom.
 Sunshine Radio
 The Pirate Archive

References

Radio stations in Shropshire
Radio stations in Worcestershire
Radio stations in Herefordshire
Radio stations established in 1992
Former pirate radio stations
Pirate radio stations in the United Kingdom
Ludlow